The 2019 Osun State House of Assembly election was held on March 9, 2019, to elect members of the Osun State House of Assembly in Nigeria. All the 26 seats were up for election in the Osun State House of Assembly.

Timothy Owoeye from APC representing Ilesha East constituency was elected Speaker, while Femi Popoola from APC representing Boripe/Boluwaduro constituency was elected Deputy Speaker.

Results 
The result of the election is listed below.

 Oriade constituency was won by Babatunde Ojo from APC
 Ilesha West constituency was won by Wale Adedoyin from APC
 Ilesha East constituency was won by Timothy Owoeye from APC
 Atakumosa East/West constituency was won by Babatunde Komolafe from APC
 Obokun constituency was won by Adewumi Adeyemi from PDP
 Ife East constituency was won by Olajide Adeyeye from APC
 Ife Central constituency was won by Taiwo Adebusola from APC
 Ife North constituency was won by Tunde Olatunji from APC
 Ife South constituency was won by Benjamin Ogundipe from APC
 Osogbo constituency was won by Taofeek Badamosi from APC
 Olorunda constituency was won by Kunle Akande from APC
 Irepodun/Orolu constituency was won by Nasir Olateju from APC
 Ifelodun constituency was won by Mulikat Abiola from APC
 Odo Otin constituency was won by Michael Adetoyi from APC
 Boripe/Boluwaduro constituency was won by Femi Popoola from APC
 Ila constituency was won by Adebisi Jayeola from APC
 Ifedayo constituency was won by Elizabeth Abioye from APC
 Ayedire constituency was won by Gbenga Ogunkanmi from APC
 Ola Oluwa constituency was won by Hadirullai Adegbile from APC
 Iwo constituency was won by Halil Uzamot from APC
 Ede North constituency was won by Babajide Kofoworola from PDP
 Ede South constituency was won by Niran Atidade from PDP
 Egbedore constituency was won by Babatunde Ibirogba from APC
 Ejigbo constituency was won by Adekunle Oyekunle from APC
 Irewole/Isokan constituency was won by Marouf Olanrewaju from APC
 Ayedaade constituency was won by Taiwo Adebayo from APC

References 

Osun
Osun State elections